The Georgetown Light and Water Works is a historic building in Georgetown, Texas.

It was built in 1911 and added to the National Register of Historic Places in 1996.

See also

National Register of Historic Places listings in Williamson County, Texas

References

Industrial buildings and structures on the National Register of Historic Places in Texas
Energy infrastructure completed in 1911
Buildings and structures in Georgetown, Texas
1911 establishments in Texas
Energy infrastructure on the National Register of Historic Places
National Register of Historic Places in Williamson County, Texas
Water supply infrastructure on the National Register of Historic Places